V Corps, formerly known as the Fifth Corps, is a regular corps of the United States Army at Fort Knox. It was previously active during World War I, World War II, the Cold War, the Kosovo War, and the War on Terrorism.

Shoulder sleeve insignia
The corps's shoulder patch, a pentagon whose points lie on an imaginary circle 2 1/8 inches (5.40 cm) in diameter whose edges are white lines 3/16-inch (.48 cm) in width and whose radial lines are white 1/8-inch (.32 cm) in width, was approved on 3 December 1918. The triangles thus outlined in white are flag blue. The pentagon represents the number of the Corps, while blue and white are the colors associated with Corps flags.

History

World War I
V Corps was organized 7–12 July 1918 in the Regular Army in France, as part of the American Expeditionary Forces. By the end of World War I, the Corps had fought in three named campaigns.

Headquarters Company, V Corps was withdrawn from the Organized Reserve on 1 October 1933 and allotted to the Regular Army. At the same time, the Corps HQ was partially activated at Fort Hayes, OH, with Regular personnel from HQ, Fifth Corps Area, and Reserve personnel from the corps area at large. Though an Regular Army, Inactive, unit from 1927 to 1940, the Corps HQ was organized provisionally for short periods using its assigned Reserve officers and staff officers from HQ, Fifth Corps Area. These periods of provisional Active Duty were generally for command post exercises and major maneuvers. HQ, V Corps was fully activated on 20 October 1940, less Reserve personnel, at Camp Beauregard, LA.

World War II
After Nazi Germany declared war on the United States on 11 December 1941, the corps deployed (January 1942) the first American soldiers to the European Theater of Operations, United States Army. That initial deployment was known as the U.S. Army Northern Ireland Force or MAGNET.  On 6 June 1944, V Corps assaulted Omaha Beach, Normandy. Corps soldiers then broke out from the beachhead, liberated Paris and Sedan, Ardennes, and raced to the German border. After liberating Luxembourg, V Corps fought in the Battle of the Bulge, captured Leipzig, made first contact with the Red Army at Torgau, and, south in Czechoslovakia, liberated Plzeň by May 1945.

Cold War

In March 1947, United States European Command directed that its combat forces were to convert to "Occupation duties." On 1 December 1950, due to concern of a Soviet threat to Western Europe during the Korean War, Seventh Army was activated as a field army in Europe.  Seventh Army absorbed the two main Occupation Duty forces then in Germany, namely the 1st Infantry Division and the United States Constabulary.

By middle 1948 limited combat training had been restored within the European Command.

In December, 1950 President Truman declared a National Emergency due to the Korean War, and four divisions were dispatched to reinforce U.S. forces in Europe, including the National Guard's 28th and 43rd Infantry Divisions.  In May 1951 the 4th Infantry Division arrived in United States Army Europe (USAREUR) in Germany, and on 3 August 1951, V Corps was reactivated and assigned to the Seventh Army in USAREUR.  In July the 2d Armored Division arrived in Germany, and on 25 August 1951 the 4th Infantry Division (HQ: Frankfurt) and 2d Armored Division (HQ: Bad Kreuznach) were assigned as V Corps divisions.

The Constabulary was inactivated upon the arrival of the four U.S. division augmentation forces to Germany. V Corps was assigned to the northern area of the U.S. Occupation Zone of Germany (which included the Fulda Gap), and the VII Corps was assigned to the southern area of the U.S. Zone (one of the National Guard divisions (the 43rd) was stationed in the Munich area, and the other (the 28th) was between Munich and Stuttgart). Several years later the newly forming West German Army displaced the GDP positions of some of the U.S. units stationed in the far southern area of West Germany.  As a consequence, the U.S. units' GDP positions were moved further north, as was the U.S. VII Corps' wartime southern boundary line (even though the U.S. units remained in their original kasernes).  This shifting action likely coincided with the same time frame as the Summer and Fall conversion of all Seventh Army units to the ROAD organization.

Although, as referenced above, in 1951 the 1st Infantry Division was assigned to the newly activated VII Corps, the significance of the V Corps assigned Fulda Gap and Meiningen Gap (AKA Grabfeld Gap) defense influenced not only the reassignment of the Wuerzburg-headquartered 1st Infantry Division to V Corps on 2 February 1952, but also the 1 October 1953 assignment of the newly formed 19th Armor Group, headquartered at Frankfurt, to V Corps. 

As of June 1954, the main unit assignments to V Corps were 1st Infantry Division, 4th Infantry Division, 2d Armored Division, and 19th Armor Group (19th AG was the size of a large brigade, with 3 tank battalions and one mech. infantry battalion stationed from Mannheim to Wildflecken).  The first U.S. armored division to be stationed east of the Rhine River in the Cold War, namely V Corps' 3d Armored Division, arrived in May/June 1956. (The 3d Armored Div. replaced the 4th Infantry Div.; later, the 2d Armored Div. was replaced by the Bad Kreuznach arriving 8th Infantry Div.)  The 19th Armor Group (HQ Frankfurt) was replaced by the 4th Armor Group on 1 July 1955 (the 4th AG was approximately the size of the replaced 19th AG); the 4th Armor Group was deactivated in the 1963 ROAD conversion. In 1955 the 1st Infantry Division gyroscoped to CONUS, and was replaced in V Corps by the 10th Infantry Division from CONUS.  In 1958 the 3rd Infantry Division gyroscoped from CONUS and the 10th Infantry Division gyroscoped to CONUS.

Due to the 1963 ROAD reorganization in USAREUR, V Corps ultimately lost two assigned units:
(1) the 4th Armor Group was inactivated;
(2) the 3rd Infantry Division, with its headquarters at Wuerzburg, was reassigned to VII Corps.

After the Cold War collapse of the Warsaw Pact, V Corps soldiers deployed both units and individuals to Saudi Arabia for the Gulf War; and to other operations in Kuwait, northern Iraq, Croatia, Somalia, Republic of Macedonia, Rwanda, and Zaire.

Organization 1989 

At the end of the Cold War in 1989 V Corps consisted of the following units:

  V Corps, Frankfurt, West Germany
  3rd Armored Division, Frankfurt
  4th Infantry Division (Mechanized), Fort Carson, Colorado (Operation Reforger unit)
  8th Infantry Division (Mechanized), Bad Kreuznach
  V Corps Artillery, Frankfurt
  41st Field Artillery Brigade, Babenhausen
  42nd Field Artillery Brigade, Giessen
  11th Armored Cavalry Regiment, Fulda
  194th Armored Brigade, Fort Knox, Kentucky (Operation Reforger unit)
  197th Infantry Brigade (Mechanized), Fort Benning, Georgia (Operation Reforger unit)
  12th Aviation Brigade, Wiesbaden
  130th Engineer Brigade, Hanau
  18th Military Police Brigade, Frankfurt
  22nd Signal Brigade (Corps), Frankfurt
  205th Military Intelligence Brigade, Frankfurt
  3rd Corps Support Command, Wiesbaden

1990s

In December 1994, as part of the realignment of United States Armed Forces, V Corps moved from the IG Farben Building to Campbell Barracks in Heidelberg, severing a forty-three-year tie with Frankfurt. The corps reached out to the armed forces of eastern Europe with numerous initiatives to foster closer ties and better understanding. Maintaining the NATO commitment, V Corps in 1994 created two bi-national corps with Germany. For Command Component Land Heidelberg missions, the corps commanded the 13th (German) Armored Infantry Division, while II (German) Corps commanded the 1st Armored Division. 

In December 1995, V Corps deployed 1st Armored Division and elements of six separate brigades for the Implementation Force (IFOR). The corps headquarters and Headquarters Company, the 3d Support Command, and the separate brigades helped form the National Support Element headquartered in Hungary for United States Armed Forces in Bosnia. Brigades of the two divisions rotated in the peace enforcement mission for a number of years in Bosnia. Headquarters and Headquarters Company, V Corps, was decorated with the Army Superior Unit Award in 1998 in recognition of the unit's performance in Implementation Force (IFOR). In April 1999, V Corps deployed the headquarters and subordinate units to Albania as Task Force Hawk, a force involved in the ongoing crisis in Kosovo. The 1st Infantry Division served in Kosovo twice and the 1st Armored Division served once, in addition to V Corps separate brigades.

War on Terrorism

At the end of 2002, V Corps deployed to Kuwait under United States Central Command for the Iraq War. The United States-led coalition brought about a regime change in Iraq and satisfied international concerns about Iraq and weapons of mass destruction. The corps and its maneuver brigades crossed into Iraq on 21 March 2003 as the main effort. In sixteen days of fighting, V Corps advanced more than 540 miles straight-line distance from Kuwait to Baghdad, decisively defeated the Iraqi Armed Forces, and toppled the regime of Saddam Hussein.

On 15 June 2003, the corps formed Combined Joint Task Force 7, based in Baghdad, and continued military operations to pacify the remainder of Iraq, rebuild the country, and create democratic institutions. As part of Combined Joint Task Force 7 mission, V Corps soldiers sought out and arrested or killed the major figures in the previous Iraqi regime, culminating in the arrest of Saddam Hussein himself. On 1 February 2004, V Corps was succeeded in Combined Joint Task Force 7 by III Corps and redeployed to its home station in Heidelberg, Germany. In recognition of its combat achievements in Iraq, the Department of the Army, in 2004, awarded the Headquarters and Headquarters Company the Meritorious Unit Commendation (Army).

In January 2006, the corps, deployed to Iraq and replaced XVIII Airborne Corps as the command and control element for Multi-National Corps–Iraq. During its second year-long deployment, which ended on 14 December 2006, V Corps continued to lead coalition forces and made great strides battling a widespread insurgency, and conducting a massive rebuilding effort.

From 2012 to 2013, V Corps served in the Islamic Republic of Afghanistan, providing command and control of all U.S. ground forces stationed there. On 16 February 2012, it was announced that Headquarters and Headquarters Battalion, V Corps would inactivate upon redeployment from Afghanistan per guidance issued by the Department of the Army earlier that same year. On 12 June 2013, V Corps was awarded an Army Superior Unit Award, a Meritorious Unit Commendation, then ceremonially inactivated at Biebrich Palace, Wiesbaden, Germany.

Reactivation 
On 11 February 2020, the United States Department of the Army announced the activation of corps headquarters (V Corps). V Corps Headquarters will have approximately 635 soldiers, with approximately 200 who will support an operational command post in Europe. The Corps Headquarters is projected to be operational by autumn 2020.

On 12 February 2020, the Army announced that V Corps' new headquarters would be located at Fort Knox, Kentucky.

United States Army Chief of Staff, General James McConville stated:"The activation of an additional Corps headquarters provides the needed level of command and control focused on synchronizing U.S. Army, allied, and partner nation tactical formations operating in Europe. It will enhance U.S. Army Europe and U.S. European Command as they work alongside allies and partners to promote regional stability and security."The establishment of V Corps supports United States European Command's request for increased command and control capability.

In May 2020, MG John Kolasheski, commanding general of the 1st Infantry Division was nominated to command the newly reactivated V Corps. Once confirmed by the Senate he would receive a third star. Kolasheski was confirmed to the rank of lieutenant general on 21 May 2020. He was promoted by Army Chief of Staff James C. McConville on 4 August 2020 in Kraków, Poland. McConville announced that V Corps forward headquarters would be established in Poland after the next fiscal year starts on 1 October 2020. 200 of the expected 630 headquarters staff members would be stationed in Poznan on a rotational basis.   
The forward headquarters will "conduct operational planning, mission command and oversight of the rotational forces in Europe", and work alongside allies and partners to build readiness and enhance interoperability.  

On 21 July 2021 MG Jeffery Broadwater was announced as DCG, V Corps. (In May of 2021, MG Matthew Van Wagenen was appointed as DCG-Manoeuvre to be based in Poznan, Poland, but who presently serves as a DCG for the Army component of SHAPE.)

On 7 March 2022 a V Corps headquarters element deployed to Germany, joining the forward element already in Europe, to "provide additional command and control of U.S. Army forces in Europe." The headquarters is also tasked to "provide a more robust presence in Europe and enable the Corps to synchronize current contingency operations, support the ongoing mission to reinforce NATO’s eastern flank and coordinate multinational exercises across the continent." This deployment is in response to the Russian invasion of Ukraine. 

At the 29 June 2022 NATO summit in Madrid US President Joe Biden announced that a permanent military base would be established in Poland that would serve as the new headquarters of V Corps and  "strengthen the US-NATO interoperability across the entire eastern flank," in further response to the Russian campaign in Ukraine.  On 30 July 2022 the headquarters of V Corps (Forward) in Poznan was renamed Camp Kosciuszko.

See also

Ardennes-Alsace Order of Battle
Liberation of Iraq Order of Battle
List of commanders
Meuse-Argonne Order of Battle

References

Bibliography

 Burger, Eric H. Staff Sgt. "V Corps Song–March "Victory!"." Print.

 Condon, Edward J., Jr., and Raymond A. Mathews Historical Report of the V Corps-1949. n.p., 1950.
 Hill, John G. V Corps Operations in ETO, 6 Jan 1942 – 9 May 1945. Paris: Paul Viviers, 1945.
 History V Corps June 6, '44. 668th Engineer Topographic Company, 1945.
 Huebner, C.R. "V Corps From Belgium to Czechoslovakia". Army and Navy Journal 83 (4 December 1945):55ff.
 Tucker, Spencer, ed. A Global Chronology of Conflict: From the Ancient World to the Modern Middle East. Volume V: 1861–1918. Santa Barbara, Calif.: ABC-CLIO, 2010.
 United States. Dept. of Army. Center of Military History. Armies, Corps, Divisions, and Separate Brigades. Wilson, John B., Comp. Washington: GPO, 1999.
 United States. Dept. of Army. Center of Military History. "Ruck it up!" The post-Cold War transformation of V Corps, 1990–2001. By Charles E. Kirkpatrick. Washington: GPO, 2006.
 United States. Dept. of Army. Combined Arms Center. V Corps in Bosnia-Herzegovina, 1995–1996: an oral history. Harold E. Raugh, Jr., Ed. Fort Leavenworth, Kansas: Combat Studies Institute Press, 2010.
 United States. Dept. of Army. Headquarters, V Corps. "It Will Be Done!" U.S. Army V Corps, 1918–2009: a pictorial history. Harold E. Raugh, Jr., Ed. Grafenwoehr, Germany: Druckerei Hutzler, 2009.
 United States. Dept. of Army. Headquarters, V Corps. The History of V Corps. By Charles E. Kirkpatrick. n.p., 2001.

External links

 Government
 Lineage and Honors Information at the U.S. Army Center of Military History
 General information
 V Corps at GlobalSecurity.org

1918 establishments in France
1919 disestablishments in Kansas
1922 establishments in Kentucky
1924 disestablishments in Kentucky
1940 establishments in Louisiana
2013 disestablishments in Germany
2020 establishments in Kentucky
Corps of the United States Army
Corps of the United States in World War II
Military units and formations established in 1918
Military units and formations disestablished in 1919
Military units and formations established in 1922
Military units and formations disestablished in 1924
Military units and formations established in 1940
Military units and formations disestablished in 2013
Military units and formations established in 2020
Military units and formations of the United States in World War I
Military units and formations of the United States in the Cold War
Military units and formations of the United States in the War on Terror
Organizations based in Kentucky